Dykes Creek is a stream in the U.S. state of Georgia. It is a tributary to the Etowah River.

Dykes Creek was named after Dr. G. J. Dykes, a pioneer citizen. A variant name was "Dikes Creek".

References

Rivers of Georgia (U.S. state)
Rivers of Floyd County, Georgia